Jay Lefkowitz (born 20 November 1962) is an American lawyer.  He is a senior partner at the Kirkland & Ellis law firm, and he also served as President George W. Bush's Special Envoy for Human Rights in North Korea.

Career
Lefkowitz is a graduate of Columbia University and Columbia Law School. Earlier in the George W. Bush administration, Lefkowitz was general counsel in the Office of Management and Budget and later deputy director of domestic policy at the White House.  He crafted Bush's policy on stem cell research.  After leaving the White House in 2003, he was twice offered West Wing jobs.

Lefkowitz also serves as a lecturer in law at Columbia Law School, in which capacity he teaches a seminar on the Supreme Court.  This seminar uses a simulation method whereby students act in the roles of Supreme Court justices hearing cases and writing opinions in cases currently pending before the Court.

Lefkowitz was also director of cabinet affairs and deputy executive secretary to the Domestic Policy Council for President George H. W. Bush.  Near the end of the Cold War, Lefkowitz was active in the movement to allow Soviet Jews or "Refuseniks" to emigrate from the Soviet Union.

Government service 
Lefkowitz is credited as, while serving as general counsel in the White House's Office of Management and Budget, having been the architect of President George W. Bush's decision to allow federal money to pay for some amount of research on stem cells from human embryos.

North Korea
As envoy for North Korean human rights, Lefkowitz referred to the North Korean government as a "deeply oppressive nation". He criticized the creation of the Kaesong Industrial Region as exploitative, since it failed to bring true economic reform to North Korea and allowed South Korean corporations to pay North Korean workers as little as $2 a day.

Notable litigation  
In two major cases before the Supreme Court of the United States, Pliva Inc. v. Mensing, (564 U.S. 604 (2011) and Mutual Pharmaceutical Co. v. Bartlett, 570 U.S. 472 (2013), Lefkowitz succeeded in persuading the Supreme Court that because federal law absolutely demands that generic drugs precisely follow the FDA-approved labels of the related brand-name drug produced by another manufacturer, states may not impose liability on generic manufacturers who do nothing but use the labels federal law requires them to use.

In 2007/2008, in the course of serving as a criminal defense lawyer for Jeffrey Epstein, eventually convicted of sex offences, Lefkowitz negotiated a deal with prosecutor Alexander Acosta. Acosta would later come under attack for having made this agreement with Epstein's defense lawyers, and pressure connected with whether the deal was in the best interest of the prosecution led Acosta to resign his position as Secretary of Labor in 2019.

In Corber v. Xanodyne Pharmaceuticals Inc., the United States Court of Appeals for the Ninth Circuit, sitting en banc, ruled in favor of Lefkowitz's client, Teva Pharmaceuticals. Hundreds of plaintiffs had brought actions against Teva in various California state courts and had asked that the cases be coordinated before one state court judge "for all purposes." The defendants sought to remove the cases to federal court pursuant to the Class Action Fairness Act ("CAFA"), on the ground that the plaintiffs had proposed a joint trial.  But the District Court and a three-judge panel of the Ninth Circuit held that the cases were not removable because the plaintiffs had not explicitly asked that the cases be tried together, which is essential to the definition of a removable "mass action" under CAFA. The Ninth Circuit granted en banc review and ruled in favor of Lefkowitz's client, that the plaintiffs' request for coordination "for all purposes" necessarily encompassed a request for a joint trial. Hence, the case was properly removed to federal court.

In Association for Accessible Medicines v. Frosh,  Lefkowitz secured a major victory on behalf of his client in the United States Court of Appeals for the Fourth Circuit. During its 2017 legislative session, the Maryland General Assembly had passed a law prohibiting a manufacturer or wholesale distributor from "engag[ing] in price gouging in the sale of an essential off-patent or generic drug." Md. Code Ann. Health Genera; § 2-802(a). The Court ruled that the statute violated the Commerce Clause of the United States Constitution because a state may not regulate transactions that occur completely out of that state. In the case of the Maryland statute, the state statute was impermissibly regulating transactions between manufacturers and distributors that took place wholly outside of Maryland.

Notoriety for Representing Jeffrey Epstein in Controversial 2006 Florida Case
Mr. Lefkowitz is well-known for representing Jeffrey Epstein in a 2006 Florida case, and working with former colleague and Kirkland & Ellis partner Alexander Acosta, then US Attorney in Florida, to cut a deal   highly favorable to Epstein, which exonerated Epstein from the most serious offenses, bypassing the victims and painting Epstein's character as that of a benevolent benefactor figure with a compelling life story. ". In 2019, The Wall Street Journal published an article detailing the extent of Mr. Lefkowitz' work for the disgraced financier: "In letters and a meeting with the Manhattan office, the defense lawyers dismissed Florida police allegations of Mr. Epstein’s sexual encounters with girls as “inflammatory” and “unreliable” and portrayed him as a benefactor with a compelling life story who was “not in any way a typical sex offender.”.

Notable pro bono representation 
Lefkowitz has been deeply involved in the pro bono representation of New York parents who assert that the teacher-tenure system in place has led to inadequate education for countless students across the State because it often precludes dismissal of ineffective teachers. In 2018, a New York appellate court ruled that the case could go on, rejecting the State's argument that some changes the New York State Legislature had enacted necessarily served to solve the problems. Following that decision, Lefkowitz stated, "New York's constitution guarantees all children in the state a sound basic education, and the current teacher employment statutes are simply failing our children by keeping ineffective teachers in our public schools,... This decision will finally allow us to get the evidence from the State that will vindicate the rights of parents and children across the state."

In 2013–14, Lefkowitz provided pro bono representation to a group of chassidic storekeepers who had posted signs on their stores with a dress code involving modest clothing. The New York Commission on Civil Rights imposed significant daily fines on the storekeepers, asserting that the dress code constituted gender-based discrimination even though it applied to both men and women, and even though dress codes that actually do distinguish between genders are prevalent in many settings, including the courts and restaurants. On the eve of trial, following a ruling in the storekeepers' favor by the administrative judge, the Commission agreed to abandon its efforts to prosecute the storeowners

Writings 
In 2014, Lefkowitz authored an article for Commentary titled "The Rise of Social Orthodoxy: A Personal Account." The article describes a phenomenon in which some adherents of Jewish modern orthodoxy are motivated to adhere to certain ritual practices by a strong desire to belong to a social group with traditions, as opposed to being motivated by a commitment to abide by God's commandments and demands. Indeed, some members of the group, even those who pray regularly, may not even believe in a God who issues such decrees. The article triggered considerable critical response from some Orthodox rabbis and leaders. Commentary published a series of letters about the article, accompanied by Lefkowitz's response to each letter.

In 2009, Lefkowitz authored an article in Commentary titled "AIDS and the President--An Inside Account." Based on his service as deputy domestic policy adviser to President George W. Bush, Lefkowitz provided an account of the events leading to the United States making financial contributions of an unprecedented scope to the international fight against AIDS. Rebutting claims that President Bush was making token contributions just for show, Lefkowitz describes his observations of the President's deep moral commitment to fighting the epidemic, even to the point of providing funding to organizations that also perform abortions—something that drew bitter opposition from some core conservative groups.

Other
President George W. Bush appointed Lefkowitz to serve on the Honorary Delegation to accompany him to Jerusalem for the celebration of the 60th anniversary of the State of Israel in May 2008.

References 

1962 births
United States Department of State officials
Living people
American Orthodox Jews
Columbia Law School alumni
Politicians from Albany, New York
United States Special Envoys
People associated with Kirkland & Ellis
Lawyers from Albany, New York
Columbia College (New York) alumni